The 2020 Summit League women's soccer tournament was the postseason women's soccer tournament for the Summit League held on April 15 and 17, 2021. It was played in the Spring of 2021 along with the conference season due to the COVID-19 pandemic. The three-match tournament took place at Caniglia Field in Omaha, Nebraska. The four-team single elimination tournament consisted of two rounds based on seeding from regular season conference play. South Dakota State was the defending champion, and were unable to defend their title, losing to Omaha in the semifinal game in penalties. Denver won the championship game over Omaha, which was their fourth since entering the conference and also for coach Jeff Hooker. Denver has now won or participated in the championship game in the last four tournaments.

Seeding and Standings 
The top four of the nine teams competing during the regular season qualified for the 2020 tournament. Seeding was based on regular season conference records. No tiebreakers were required as the top four teams each finished with unique conference records.

Reference:
 North Dakota State, North Dakota, Kansas City, Oral Roberts, and Western Illinois did not participate in the tournament.

Bracket 
Reference:

Schedule

Semifinals

Final

Statistics

Goalscorers 
There were 5 goals scored in 3 matches, for an average of 1 goal per match.
2 goals
 Kaitlyn Glover
 Sydney Sharp
1 goal
 Sami Feller

All-Tournament team 
Reference:

MVP in bold

References 

Summit League Women's Soccer Tournament